is a railway station in Ōaza Tokunaga, Nishi-ku, Fukuoka City, Fukuoka Prefecture, Japan. It is operated by JR Kyushu and is on the Chikuhi Line.

Lines
Local and rapid services on the Chikuhi Line stop at this station.

Station layout 
The station consists of an island platform serving two elevated tracks. The station building has both a north and south entrance and houses a waiting area, a convenience store and a staffed ticket window. Access to the elevated island platform is by means of escalators and elevators.

Management of the station has been outsourced to the JR Kyushu Tetsudou Eigyou Co., a wholly owned subsidiary of JR Kyushu specialising in station services. It staffs the ticket counter which is equipped with a Midori no Madoguchi facility.

Platforms

Adjacent stations

History
JR Kyushu opened the station on 23 September 2005 as an additional station on the existing track of the Chikuhi Line.

Passenger statistics
In fiscal 2016, the station was used by an average of 8,264 passengers daily (boarding passengers only), and it ranked 18th among the busiest stations of JR Kyushu.

Environs
This station is the doorway of the Kyushu University Ito campus, but it is approximately 4 km away from this station northwest to the campus, and it is not common to move on foot between a station and campuses. Bus to the campus is operated for transportation, and the taxi is resident, too.

ÆON Fukuoka Ito Shopping Center
Genyou High School
Fukuoka-Maiduru High School and Junior High School
Marutai Head Office
Kyushu University Ito Campus

See also
 List of railway stations in Japan

References

External links
Kyūdai-Gakkentoshi (JR Kyushu)

Railway stations in Japan opened in 2005
Chikuhi Line
Railway stations in Fukuoka Prefecture
Stations of Kyushu Railway Company